Benjamin David Cotton (born 13 September 1993) is an English cricketer. Cotton played between 2014 and 2017 for Derbyshire in first-class matches as a righthanded batsman who bowls right arm medium-fast pace. Cotton played youth cricket for Newcastle-under-Lyme's Porthill Park Cricket Club. In 2018, he has played for Northamptonshire.

References

External links

1993 births
English cricketers
Derbyshire cricketers
Living people
Cricketers from Stoke-on-Trent
Staffordshire cricketers
Northamptonshire cricketers